Quesnelia testudo is a species of bromeliad in the genus Quesnelia.

This species is endemic to the Atlantic Forest ecoregion of southeastern Brazil.

Description 
It can be found growing on trees in virgin forests near Serra do Mar.  It has a well-formed rosette of about 20 plain green leaves.  These leaves have lightly serrated edges and are tipped by a sharp spine.  The bloom reaches about a foot high. The inflorescence bears rosy red bracts and violet or white petals. It is a semi-cold hardy bromeliad that can tolerate temperatures down to 25 °F for a few hours.

Cultivars 
 Quesnelia 'Farro'
 × Quesmea 'Lymanii'

References 

 
BSI Cultivar Registry Retrieved 11 October 2009

testudo
Endemic flora of Brazil
Flora of the Atlantic Forest
Flora of Paraná (state)
Flora of São Paulo (state)